An aerial cable or air cable is an insulated cable usually containing all conductors required for an electrical distribution system (typically using aerial bundled cables) or a telecommunication line, which is suspended between utility poles or electricity pylons.  As aerial cables are completely insulated there is no danger of electric shock when touching them and there is no requirement for mounting them with insulators on pylons and poles.
A further advantage is they require less right of way than overhead lines for the same reason.  They can be designed as shielded cables for telecommunication purposes. If the cable falls, it may still operate if its insulation is not damaged.  

As aerial cables are installed on pylons or poles, they may be cheaper to install than underground cables, as no work for digging is required, which can be very expensive in rocky areas.

Use 
Aerial cables are mostly used for telecommunication systems or for power transmissions with voltages below 1000 volts. Aerial cable for voltages up to 69,000 volts has also been built,  for the supply of farms, waterworks, transmitters and other facilities outside of urban areas. Aerial cables are not often used in transmission circuits because of the difficulty in insulating such high voltage wire. Because of the proven reliability benefits of insulated aerial cables over traditional air-insulated wire, the Electric Power Institute has been working with utility companies to develop better insulating materials. In 1996 they were able to successfully convert one lower-voltage transmission circuit to insulated cable.

See also 
 Aerial insert
 Overhead power line

References

Power cables
Electric power distribution